Neil Haddon (born 1967) is a British/Australian painter. His paintings display a wide variety of influences and styles, from hard edge geometric abstraction to looser expressive figurative painting. Haddon currently lives and works in Hobart, Tasmania.

Early life and education 
Haddon was born in Epsom, England. He was born at 'Eversleigh' in Worple Road – the former residence of the English writer George Gissing. He earned a B-TEC Diploma in Art and Design from the Epsom School of Art, Surrey, England (1985–1987) (now the University for the Creative Arts) where he studied alongside the painter Cecily Brown. He received an Honours degree from West Surrey College of Art and Design (1987–1990) (now the University for the Creative Arts) where he studied under Stephen Farthing.

Career 
Haddon relocated to Barcelona, Spain in 1990 and lived and worked there until 1996. He maintained a studio in Cornellá throughout this period. He held his first solo exhibition at Galería Carles Poy in 1992. In 1996 he moved to Tasmania, Australia. He has lived and worked there since then. In 2002, he was awarded a Master of Fine Art from the Tasmanian School of Art, University of Tasmania (now the School of Creative Arts and Media, University of Tasmania, CAM). He has held a variety of part-time teaching posts at CAM, lectures in painting and is a post graduate supervisor. In 2014 Haddon undertook a three-month residency in New York at the Australia Council for the Arts Greene Street Studio. Haddon was the Chair of Contemporary Art Tasmania from 2010 to 2016 and is currently a board member of Salamanca Arts Centre.

Work 
Haddon's paintings combine a wide range of influences and styles, from geometric abstraction to figuration. He has become known for using a variety of materials and techniques, from flat high gloss enamel painting to expressive oil painting. The sources for Haddon's paintings come from an array of visual media that includes local newspaper images, archival photographs of Australia and the UK, and the paintings of earlier 'colonial' artists such as John Glover and Paul Gauguin. His paintings have been described as "a meta-landscape mash up of samples from John Glover and Paul Gaugin and the reflectiveness of your granny's ornamental biscuit tins". Kelly Gellatly, senior curator of contemporary art at the National Gallery of Victoria described Haddon's work as abstract painting that "doesn't depict a traditional landscape but is evocative in its use of darker aspects of landscape." Haddon describes working from these sources as "a process of razing an image to the ground and then building back up." Andrew Frost of The Guardian described Haddon's 2016 painting I Read Day of the Triffids When I Lived in England (and now I Live in Tasmania) as "a delightful post-painting nightmare."

Exhibitions 
Haddon's paintings have been exhibited in Australia, the US and Europe. Recent exhibitions include: Theatre of the World, MONA (and La Maison Rouge, Paris) curated by Jean-Hubert Martin, Platform Los Angeles,  Strange Trees, Tasmanian Museum and Art Gallery, Hobart, This Is No Fantasy / Dianne Tanzer Gallery, Melbourne and MOP Gallery, Sydney. His paintings were featured in Ten Days on the Island, 2003 and were described by Daniel Thomas as "a high-spirited meeting of Pop art and popular culture with austere reto-Futurist abstraction."

Collections 
Haddon's work is held in private and public collections internationally and in Australia by the National Gallery of Victoria, Artbank, Sydney, the Tasmanian Museum and Art Gallery, the University of Tasmania Fine Art Collection, Devonport Regional Gallery and the Gold Coast Arts Centre.

Awards 
Haddon's painting 'The Visit', inspired by his migration to Tasmania and H.G. Wells' novel The War of the Worlds was awarded the  Hadley's Art Prize in 2018. Hadley's Prize judge and Tasmanian Museum and Art Gallery curator, Jane Stewart, described the painting as "a complex and accomplished painting that raises many questions about landscape, custodianship and contact history.” Haddon's painting Portrait with Paperchains, featuring his brother in law, Timothy Walker CBE, Chief Executive and Artistic Director of the London Philharmonic Orchestra, was awarded the $25,000 City of Whyalla Art Prize in 2011. Haddon returned to judge the Whyalla Prize in 2013. ‘Purblind (Opiate)’ won the $25,000 Glover Prize (Tasmania) 2008. His work ‘Survivor (del tink gyp flynn)’ was awarded the City of Devonport Art Award in 2006. His paintings have been selected for other significant art prizes including The Wynne Prize (Art Gallery of New South Wales), The Arthur Guy Memorial Art Prize (Bendigo Art Gallery)

References

External links 
 Museum of Old and New Art
 Ocula
 Surrey Institute of Art & Design, University College

British painters
British male painters
Australian painters
1967 births
Living people